Blysmus compressus is a species of flat sedge belonging to the family Cyperaceae.

Its native range is Europe to Himalaya.

References

Cyperaceae